Daniel James Grech-Marguerat, also known as Dan Grech, (born 11 July 1981 in Bedford), is an English / Maltese recording engineer, record producer and mixer. His production style pulls together a blend of alternative and pop genres. He is recognized for bringing a contemporary a sound to alternative music and a left-leaning edge to pop music.

Past work includes Liam Gallagher, Halsey, George Ezra, The Vaccines, Lana Del Rey, Keane, Hurts, The Kooks, Scissor Sisters, Dragonette, Moby and Howling Bells. A mutual admiration led to work with Keane who quoted his work with The Vaccines as one of the inspirations of their 2012 album Strangeland.

Biography 
Dan Grech started out working at RAK Studios in St Johns Wood London as an assistant recording engineer. He worked with acclaimed record producer Nigel Godrich for a period of 2 years, opening up a number of opportunities for the young Grech, participating in records with Charlotte Gainsbourg, The Divine Comedy, Beck and Radiohead. It was through this work with Godrich that he won a Grammy Award in 2009 for his work on Radiohead's 'In Rainbows' which picked up 'Best Alternative Album 2009'.

In 2006 he mixed the Scissor Sisters second multi-platinum selling album entitled Ta-Dah, including the hit single "I Don't Feel Like Dancin'", co-written by Elton John, which went to number one in 8 countries, and top 10 in 20 countries.

Later that year Grech mixed the debut record for the band Dragonette, starting a long-term relationship with the band. He went on to co-produce and mix all their work to date. More recently the band had huge success with the track Hello co-written and performed with Martin Solveig.

In 2007 Grech produced two tracks for the Radio 1 Established 1967 anniversary album, one for The Kooks and one for The Kaiser Chiefs. Following on from this he went on to produce several tracks for The Kooks second award-winning album Konk. Also in 2007 he mixed the Moby album Last Night.

2008 – 2010 saw Grech work with artists such as Sam Sparro, Just Jack and Ke$ha, as well as produce the album Radio Wars for Australian band Howling Bells.

In 2010 Grech produced the debut album for The Vaccines, What Did You Expect from The Vaccines?. In an interview in May 2011 Pete Robertson, The Vaccines drummer, discussed what they saw as a "Really great partnership" and the aspects Grech brought to the Album. Grech produced this hotly tipped band who reached number 4 in the album charts in 2011. The record went on to reach platinum in the UK and is still the band's best selling album. This was the only Vaccines record produced by Grech.

Other releases in 2011 included singles and remixes for the award-winning English band Hurts, the hugely popular Lana Del Rey EP "Video Games".

Grech went on to mix the multi-platinum selling Lana Del Rey album Born to Die which went to number one in over 15 countries in February 2012 has sold over 7 million copies to date. This was the only work Grech performed with Lana Del Rey.

In May 2012 Keane released their 4th studio album Strangeland, which Dan both produced and mixed. In a recent interview pianist Tim Rice-Oxley told NME, "We loved what (producer) Dan Grech did on The Vaccines album. It had just come out. He'd also done stuff with Radiohead and produced the second Howling Bells album, which I loved. As luck would have it, Dan was a massive Keane fan, so we ended working with him.". Strangeland went straight to number one and went Gold within three weeks.

2013 saw the release of Long Way Down the debut record for Tom Odell, winner of the BRITs Critics Choice Award. Odell was later named 'songwriter of the year' for this album at the 2014 Ivor Novello Awards ceremony. In 2013 Grech also produced The Brink, the second album for the award-winning Australian band The Jezabels.

Grech's main focus in 2014 was Liverpool based guitar band Circa Waves. He produced and mixed their debut album which entered the UK charts at number 10 in April 2015. Singles from the album included "Fossils" and "T-Shirt Weather", both of which were A-List Radio One records. When discussing the recording of their album in a recent interview, frontman Kieran told Echo magazine: "Dan is amazing. He’s so collaborative and open to any kind of suggestion. I’d always dreamed about making our first album and to do it with him was everything we could have hoped for. We didn't know what to expect but he was so encouraging and we came out feeling that we’d learned loads."

In November that year Grech co-produced and mixed the music for the much talked about John Lewis advert which featured "Monty The Penguin". The track was a Tom Odell cover of The Beatles song "Real Love".

Grech's biggest record of 2015 was from American artist Halsey. He had previously mixed her Room 93 EP and now mixed Badlands her debut record which entered the Billboard chart at number 2 and was a top 10 record in 6 other countries. The album quickly went on to sell over a million copies and reach two billion streams worldwide. It includes platinum singles "New Americana", "Colors" and "Gasoline" . The track "Castle" from the album was also reworked and used as the title track to the film The Huntsman.

In 2015 he mixed Night Swim, the debut album for Josef Salvat. This included Josef's cover of Rhianna's "Diamonds" which featured on a Sony Bravia advert. He also additionally produced and mixed the Birdy and Rhodes duet "Let It All Go", as well as the Shura single White Light.

At the start of 2016 Grech worked with Mumford & Sons. He recorded the Johannesburg EP in South Africa with the band. The EP was a collaboration with Senegalese singer Baaba Maal, South African pop group Beatenberg, and Malawian-British singer-producer combo The Very Best. He mixed the EP back in London and it was released in June.

Later in 2016 new artist Grace released her debut album FMA. Grech mixed most tracks on the record which featured Grace's cover of the song "You Don't Own Me" with American rapper G-Easy.

He produced two singles for Brit Award Nominee Izzy Bizu, including the radio hit White Tiger., mixed Regina Spektor's seventh studio album Remember Us To Life, and co-produced and mixed Keaton Henson's third solo album.

In February 2017 LA based trio MUNA released their debut album "About U" which Grech mixed and co-produced with the band. That year he also mixed the multi-platinum single "Waves" for Australian artist Dean Lewis and come back single "The Man" for the American rock band The Killers.

Grech's biggest production release of 2017 was with Liam Gallagher having produced on Gallaghers previous solo effort As You Were, Grech produced 8 of the 12 tracks including the single "For What It's Worth".

When discussing making the record with Grech in a Guardian interview Liam said: “I’ll play him a tune very badly and he’ll go, ‘Yeah, I get where you’re coming from’ and get the acoustics down and away we go.” The album was released on October 6th. It sold over 100,000 units in the first week giving it a gold certification as it entered the UK chart at number one. It went platinum three months later.

In 2018 George Ezra released his second album Staying at Tamara's. Grech provided mixes for the project and this became Grech's 8th number one album to date. This year he also mixed releases for Rae Morris, Mikky Ekko, and the forthcoming album for Tom Grennan.

Discography

References

External links
Official Website

1978 births
Living people
English record producers
English audio engineers
Grammy Award winners